Naengmyeon (in South Korea) or raengmyŏn (in North Korea) is a noodle dish of North Korean origin which consists of long and thin handmade noodles made from the flour and starch of various ingredients, including buckwheat (메밀, memil), potatoes, sweet potatoes, arrowroot starch (darker color and chewier than buckwheat noodles), and kudzu. Buckwheat predominates (despite the name, it is not a wheat but rather is more closely related to sorrel).  Other varieties of naengmyeon are made from ingredients such as seaweed and green tea. 

In modern times, the mul naengmyeon (물 냉면) variant is commonly associated with and popularly consumed during the summer, however, it was historically a dish enjoyed during winter.

History 
According to the 19th-century documents of Dongguksesigi, naengmyeon has been made since the Joseon Dynasty. Originally a delicacy in northern Korea, especially in the cities of Pyongyang and Hamhung, naengmyeon became widely popular throughout Korea in  both North and South Korea after the Korean War.

Naengmyeon is served in a large brass or stainless-steel bowl with a tangy iced broth, julienned cucumbers, slices of Korean pear, thin, wide strips of lightly pickled radish, and either a boiled egg or slices of cold boiled beef or both. Spicy mustard sauce (or mustard oil) and vinegar are often added before consumption. Traditionally, the long noodles would be eaten without cutting, as they symbolized longevity of life and good health, but servers at restaurants usually ask if the noodles should be cut prior to eating, and use scissors to cut the noodles.

Varieties 
The two main varieties of naengmyeon are mul naengmyeon (물 냉면) and bibim naengmyeon (비빔 냉면). The former is served as a cold noodle soup made from beef, chicken or dongchimi broth. The latter is served with a spicy dressing made primarily from gochujang (red chili paste) and eaten mixed. In the case of bibim naengmyeon, a bowl of broth used in mul naengmyeon or plain broth from the boiled noodles itself are often served on the side. This broth can be served hot or cold depending on the restaurant and type of broth. Boiled eggs and sliced cucumbers are often added as a garnish.

Mul naengmyeon originates from Pyongyang. Pyŏngyang naengmyŏn is mainly made from buckwheat and either beef or pheasant broth. It also uses dongchimi broth or a mixture of it, while adding sliced pieces of radish to the dish. Vinegar, mustard oil (provided on request at most restaurants), and sugar is added according to taste before eating.  South Koreans do not add sugar and use beef broth exclusively. In South Jeolla Province, mul naengmyeon is often served with red chili paste that is mixed in with the broth. The effect is similar to adding the broth to a bowl of bibim naengmyeon.

A version of bibim naengmyeon originates from Hamhung, the hoe naengmyeon (회 냉면). Hoe naengmyeon is bibim naengmyeon with additional marinated raw fish (hoe), usually skate. It is eaten with gochujang and other ingredients mixed. Vinegar, sugar, and sometimes sesame oil are added according to taste. The noodles of Hamhung naengmyeon are typically made from potato or sweet potato starch, making the noodles chewier in texture compared to those of Pyongyang naengmyeon. In addition to skate, pollock (명태) can also be used in hoe naengmyeon. In this case it is referred to as myeongtae hoe naengmyeon (명태회냉면).

Another variety of naengmyeon is yeolmu naengmyeon (열무 냉면) which is served with yeolmu kimchi, made from the leaves of the yeolmu summer radish.

Jungguk-naengmyeon is a Chinese-influenced cold noodle soup in Korean Chinese cuisine.  Likewise, a Chinese version of the dish known as "Korean cold noodles" or "Dongbei cold noodles" is popular in the Northeast China region bordering Korea.

Morioka Reimen (盛岡冷麺) is derived from naengmyeon which was introduced by Korean immigrants, and is part of Japanese regional cuisine in Tohoku region.

Instant naengmyeon noodles are available, with the soup broth prepackaged with the noodles. A plastic package of mustard oil is often supplied.

Gallery

In popular culture 
In the South Korean variety show Infinite Challenge, Park Myeong-su and Jessica, a former member of Girls' Generation, performed the song "Naengmyeon" which was named after the food. The song became a hit and received wide acclaim. The plot of the 2020 daily soap opera Brilliant Heritage revolves around a naengmyeon shop, among other riches owned by an 80-year-old man who marries a 33-year-old woman to spite his children.

In politics 
During the first summit between North and South Korean leaders, Kim Jong-un and Moon Jae-in, Kim presented Moon with Pyongyang-style raengmyŏn as a gift.

See also 

 Korean cuisine
 Mak-guksu
 Milmyeon
 Kong-guksu
 Jat-guksu

References

External links 

 Naengmyeon - Official Seoul City Tourism

Buckwheat dishes
Korean cuisine
Mixed noodles
National dishes
Noodle soups
Winter in culture
Cold noodles
North Korean cuisine